Muhammad Saleem Bajwa is a Pakistani politician. Elected to the Provincial Assembly of the Punjab from Constituency PP-76 (Jhang-IV), he served as an adviser to the Chief Minister, Nawaz Sharif, during the period 1985–1988.

References

Politicians from Punjab, Pakistan
Living people
Punjabi people
Date of birth missing (living people)
Year of birth missing (living people)